Samra may refer to:

Music
Samra (rapper), German rapper
Samra (album), a 2001 album by Faudel

Places
Al-Samra, a former Palestinian village in the Tiberias subdistrict
As Samra Mountain or Samra Mountain, a mountain overlooking Ha'il, Saudi Arabia
Abu Samra, a settlement in Qatar

People with the surname
Amarjit Singh Samra, Indian politician and member of Indian National Congress
Joti Samra, Canadian television personality
Kristos Samra or Christos Samra, (born c. 15th century), Ethiopian female saint who founded a monastery of the Ethiopian Orthodox Tewahedo Church
Nicholas Samra (born 1944), eparch of the Melkite Catholic Eparchy of Newton in the United States
Ofer Samra (born 1954), Israeli-born Jewish bodybuilder and actor
Omar Samra (born 1978), adventurer, mountaineer, entrepreneur, inspirational speaker
Hardeep Singh Samra (born 1983), Sikh Politician, President, Financial Advisor Shiromani Akali Dal Amritsar (Australia Unit)

People with the given name
Samra ibn Jundab al-Fazari (d. 60 AH / 680 CE), a sahaba of Prophet Muhammad
Samra Bukhari, Pakistani novelist and dramatist
Samra Kesinovic, one of two teenage Austrian nationals who went missing in 2014
Samra Rahimli (born 1994), Azerbaijani singer representing the country in Eurovision Song Contest 2016

See also
 Samara (disambiguation)
 Samar (disambiguation)
 Samaria (disambiguation)
 Samarra, an ancient city in Iraq
 Samrah, a village in Syria
 Samsara
 Smara